Congerville is a village in Woodford County, Illinois, United States. The population was 474 as of the 2010 census, up from 466 in 2000. Congerville is part of the Peoria, Illinois Metropolitan Statistical Area.

History
The site of Congerville was surveyed for Joseph Schrock on 2 January 1888 and the village was known as Schrock. The name was changed to Conger on 27 February 1888 after the early settler Ben Conger, and then to Congerville on 31 July 1888.

Geography

Demographics

As of the census of 2000, there were 466 people, 163 households, and 131 families residing in the village. The racial makeup of the village was 98.93% White, 0.43% Native American, 0.21% Asian, and 0.43% from two or more races. None of the population is African American, Pacific Islander, Hispanic or Latino of any race, or from other races.

There were 163 households, out of which 37.4% had children under the age of 18 living with them, 74.2% were married couples living together, 2.5% had a female householder with no husband present, and 19.6% were non-families. 17.2% of all households were made up of individuals, and 4.9% had someone living alone who was 65 years of age or older. The average household size was 2.86 and the average family size was 3.27.

In the village, the population was spread out, with 28.5% under the age of 18, 11.8% from 18 to 24, 30.3% from 25 to 44, 19.1% from 45 to 64, and 10.3% who were 65 years of age or older. The median age was 30 years. For every 100 females, there were 103.5 males. For every 100 females age 18 and over, there were 104.3 males.

The median income for a household in the village was $51,786, and the median income for a family was $60,313. Males had a median income of $45,673 versus $25,132 for females. The per capita income for the village was $20,795. None of the families and 0.7% of the population were living below the poverty line, including no under eighteens and 2.8% of those over 64.

Notable people 

 Simon E. Lantz, Illinois farmer and politician, lived in Congerville.
 Andy Studebaker, outside linebacker for the Philadelphia Eagles, Kansas City Chiefs and Indianapolis Colts

References

Villages in Illinois
Villages in Woodford County, Illinois
Peoria metropolitan area, Illinois
Populated places established in 1888